

2008–09 Top 3 Standings

Events summary

Standings

References

- Overall Men, 2009-10 Biathlon World Cup